Robert Frank Nevin (March 18, 1938 – September 21, 2020) was a Canadian professional ice hockey right wing who played 18 seasons in the National Hockey League (NHL) between 1957–58 and 1975–76.

Career
Nevin scored 21 goals as a rookie with the Toronto Maple Leafs in 1960–61, and finished second in the Calder Memorial Trophy voting to teammate Dave Keon. He formed a line with Red Kelly and Frank Mahovlich, helping the Maple Leafs win the Stanley Cup in 1962 and 1963. In 1964, Nevin was traded to the New York Rangers, along with four other players, in exchange for Andy Bathgate and Don McKenney. He played for the Rangers for seven years until being traded to the Minnesota North Stars for Bobby Rousseau. Nevin also played for the Los Angeles Kings, where he recorded a personal best 72 point season and led the Kings to a franchise record 105 points. Following his time with the Kings, Nevin would head to the Edmonton Oilers of the World Hockey Association (WHA). He retired following thirteen games with the Oilers after breaking his collarbone. Nevin played 1128 career NHL games, recording 307 goals and 419 assists for 726 points.  Nevin was one of the first players in the National Hockey League to wear contact lenses, beginning in the early 1960s. During a 1962 game against the Blackhawks, Nevin lost his lens and play was stopped to find it.

Death 
On September 21, 2020, Nevin died at the age of 82 from complications of dementia and cancer.

Legacy 

In the 2009 book 100 Ranger Greats, the authors ranked Nevin at No. 51 all-time of the 901 New York Rangers who had played during the team's first 82 seasons.

Career statistics

See also
List of NHL players with 1000 games played

References

External links

1938 births
2020 deaths
Canadian ice hockey right wingers
Edmonton Oilers (WHA) players
Sportspeople from Timmins
Los Angeles Kings players
Minnesota North Stars players
National Hockey League All-Stars
New York Rangers players
Rochester Americans players
Stanley Cup champions
Toronto Maple Leafs players
Toronto Marlboros players
Ice hockey people from Ontario